The Serein is a river of eastern France. It is the main waterway of the Chablis wine district in Burgundy. The Serein is not navigable.

Origin of the name
Serein is the French word for "serene". This may reflect the placid nature of its course, or the strong monastic tradition in the area.

Geography

The Serein rises in the Auxois hills at Arconcey and flows north-north-west into the Yonne at Bassou. Both the A6 Autoroute du Soleil and the Paris-Lyon railway line follow a similar route through the area.

Main tributaries of the Serein and their length

The Serein has the following tributaries over 10 km length:
 Baigne (L) - 14 km
 Soutain (L) - 13 km
 Argentalet (L) - 26 km
 Ru du Champ Millet (R) - 10 km
 Ru de Vaucharme (L) - 16 km

note: R=Right L=Left

Départements and towns crossed

From source to mouth:

 Côte-d'Or: Arconcey, La Motte-Ternant, Époisses 
 Yonne: Montréal, L'Isle-sur-Serein, Noyers, Chablis, Pontigny Abbey, Bassou

History
The history of the area is dominated by the Church at Pontigny and nearby Auxerre, whose remit extended to building the famous castle at Noyers.

See also
Chablis wine

References

Rivers of France
Rivers of Yonne
Rivers of Bourgogne-Franche-Comté